lib or Lib may refer to:

Computing
 Library (computing)
 .lib, a static library on Microsoft platforms
 , a directory on Unix-like systems
 Lib-80, a Microsoft Library Manager tool; see Microsoft MACRO-80

People

 Lib, one of two Jaredite kings in the Book of Mormon
 Hypocorism for Elizabeth (given name)
Lib Spry, Canadian theatre director and playwright

Politics
 Lib Dems (Japan)
 Shorthand for Liberal
 Supporters of the Liberal Party of Australia
 Liberation (disambiguation) (e.g. "women's lib")
 Libertarians

Other uses
 Lib Island in the Marshall Islands
 Libra (constellation), astronomical abbreviation
 A library or institution housing books

See also
 LIB (disambiguation)